Vastegan or Vestegan may refer to:
 Vastegan, Chaharmahal and Bakhtiari
 Vestegan, Isfahan